"Shake It Off" is a song by American singer-songwriter Taylor Swift, taken from her fifth studio album, 1989. Swift wrote the lyrics and composed the melody with producers Max Martin and Shellback. An uptempo dance-pop song featuring a saxophone line in its production, it is about Swift's indifference to her detractors and their negative view of her image. The song was the lead single from 1989, which Swift marketed as her first pop album. It was released for digital download worldwide on August 19, 2014, by Big Machine Records.

Contemporary critics found the song's dance-pop production catchy, but some believed the lyrics were weak. Retrospectively, critics have considered "Shake It Off" an effective opener for the 1989 era, which transformed Swift's sound and image from country to pop. The song featured on 2010's decade-end lists by NME and Consequence. In the U.S., the single spent 50 weeks–including four weeks at number one–on the Billboard Hot 100, and received a Diamond certification from the Recording Industry Association of America (RIAA). "Shake It Off" also topped charts in Australia, Canada, Hungary, Mexico, New Zealand, and Poland.

The single was supported by a music video directed by Mark Romanek. The video, in which Swift portrays a clumsy person attempting to practice several dance moves without success, attracted accusations of cultural appropriation for featuring dance routines associated with people of color such as twerking. To promote the song, Swift performed on televised live events including the MTV Video Music Awards and the iHeartRadio Music Festival. She included "Shake It Off" on the set lists for three of her world tours: the 1989 World Tour (2015), Reputation Stadium Tour (2018), and the Eras Tour (2023). The song has received numerous accolades, including Favorite Song at the 2015 People's Choice Awards and three Grammy nominations at the 2015 Grammy Awards.

Background 
Taylor Swift had been known as a primarily country singer-songwriter until her fourth studio album Red (released in October 2012), which incorporates various pop and rock styles, transcending the country sound of her previous releases. The collaborations with Swedish pop producers Max Martin and Shellback introduced straightforward pop hooks and new genres, including electronic and dubstep, to Swift's discography. Swift and her label, Big Machine, promoted it as a country album. The album's diverse musical styles sparked a media debate over her status as a country artist, to which she replied in an interview with The Wall Street Journal, "I leave the genre labeling to other people." Swift began recording her fifth studio album, 1989, while touring to support Red in mid-2013. Inspired by 1980s synth-pop, she conceived 1989 as her first "official pop" record that would transform her image from country to pop. Martin and Shellback produced seven out of thirteen tracks for the album's standard edition, including "Shake It Off".

Music and lyrics

Swift wrote the lyrics to "Shake It Off" and composed the song's melody with Martin and Shellback. The track was recorded by Sam Holland at Conway Recording Studios in Los Angeles and by Michael Ilbert at MXM Studios in Stockholm, Sweden. It was mixed by Serban Ghenea at MixStar Studios in Virginia Beach, Virginia, and mastered by Tom Coyne at Sterling Sound Studio in New York City.

Musically, "Shake It Off" is an uptempo dance-pop song that incorporates a saxophone line. Jonas Thander, the song's saxophone player, based his part on Martin's pre-recorded MIDI horn sample, using a tenor horn. It took Thander over ten hours to edit the saxophone part, which he completed over the following day. "Shake It Off" follows a ii–IV–I chord progression; it employs a verse–prechorus–chorus form to begin with a loose verse, tighten for the prechorus, and loosen again for the chorus. The song's upbeat production is accompanied by a looping drum beat, a handclap-based bridge, and synthesized saxophones.

The lyrics of the song were inspired by the media scrutiny that Swift had experienced during her rise to stardom. In an interview with Rolling Stone in August 2014, Swift said about the song's inspiration: "I've had every part of my life dissected ... When you live your life under that kind of scrutiny, you can either let it break you, or you can get really good at dodging punches. And when one lands, you know how to deal with it. And I guess the way that I deal with it is to shake it off." Discussing the song's message with NPR in October 2014, Swift said that "Shake It Off" represented her more mature perspectives from her previous single "Mean" (2010), which was also inspired by her detractors. According to Swift, if "Mean" was where she assumed victimhood, "Shake It Off" found her in a proactive stance to "take back the narrative, and have ... a sense of humor about people who kind of get under [her] skin – and not let them get under [her] skin".

In the first verse of the song, Swift references her perceived image as a flirtatious woman with numerous romantic attachments: "I go on too many dates / But I can't make 'em stay / At least that's what people say." The lines in the chorus are arranged rhythmically to produce a catchy hook: "Cause the players gonna play, play, play, play, play / And the haters gonna hate, hate, hate, hate, hate / Baby, I’m just gonna shake, shake, shake, shake, shake." The spoken-word bridge opens with Swift asserting, "You could have been getting down to this sick beat," amidst the "dirty cheats of the world". The lyric "this sick beat" is trademarked to Swift by the U.S. Patent and Trademark Office.

Release
On August 13, 2014, Swift appeared on The Tonight Show Starring Jimmy Fallon, where she announced she would hold a live stream via Yahoo! on August 18, 2014. During the live stream, Swift announced the details of the album 1989. She debuted "Shake It Off" as the album's lead single and premiered the song's music video simultaneously. "Shake It Off" was released digitally worldwide by Big Machine on August 19. The same day, Big Machine, in partnership with Republic Records, released the song to US radio. A limited CD single edition was available on September 11. In Europe, "Shake It Off" was added to a BBC Radio playlist on August 25, Italian radio on August 29, and was released as a CD single in Germany on October 10.

The release of "Shake It Off" and its parent album 1989 had been highly anticipated, given Swift's announcement that she would abandon her country roots to release an "official pop" album. The magazine Drowned in Sound described the single as "undoubtedly ... the most significant cultural event" since Radiohead's 2011 album The King of Limbs. While noting that "Shake It Off" was not Swift's first "straight-up pop" song, Billboard Jason Lipshutz considered it a sign of a "bold foray into the unknown", in which Swift could experiment beyond her well-known formulaic country pop songs that had been critically and commercially successful.

Critical reception
"Shake It Off" received mixed reviews from music critics. While some deemed the production catchy, others found the song repetitive and lacking substance compared to Swift's previous album Red, which was perceived to be her artistic peak. Critic Randall Roberts from the Los Angeles Times lauded the song's energetic production, which they described as "perfect pop confection". Roberts, however, found the lyrics shallow, calling the song insensible to the political events at the time: "When lives are at stake and nothing seems more relevant than getting to the Actual Truth, liars and cheats can't and shouldn't be shaken off."

The Guardian Molly Fitzpatrick lauded the song's music, but felt that the lyrics fell short of Swift's songwriting abilities. Giving the song a three-out-of-five-stars score, Jeff Terich from American Songwriter regarded Swift's new direction as "a left-turn worth following". While Terich agreed that the lyrics were dismissive, he felt that critics should not have taken the song seriously because it was "pretty harmless". In a positive review, Jason Lipshutz from Billboard wrote, "Swift proves why she belongs among pop's queen bees ... the song sounds like a surefire hit." In a review of the album 1989, Alexis Petridis praised the lyrics for "twisting clichés until they sound original". In the words of Andrew Unterberger from Spin, while "Shake It Off" was musically a "red herring" that feels out of place on the album, it thematically represents Swift's new attitude on 1989, where she liberated herself from overtly romantic struggles to embrace positivity. Swift herself acknowledged the song as an outlier on 1989, and deliberately released it as the lead single to encourage audiences to explore the entire album and not just the singles.

Retrospectively, Hannah Mylrea from NME considered "Shake It Off" an effective opener for Swift's 1989 era, which transformed her image to mainstream pop. While saying that "Shake It Off" was not one of the album's better songs, Rob Sheffield from Rolling Stone applauded it for "serving as a trailer to announce her daring Eighties synth-pop makeover". Nate Jones from Vulture agreed, but described the song's bridge as "the worst 24 seconds of the entire album". In his 2019 ranking of Swift's singles, Alexis Petridis ranked "Shake It Off" third—behind "Blank Space" (2014) and "Love Story" (2008), lauding its "irresistible" hook and "sharp-tongued wit". Jane Song from Paste was less enthusiastic, placing "Shake It Off" among Swift's worst songs in her catalog, writing: "Swift has a pattern of choosing the worst song from each album as the lead single."

Commercial performance
After one day of release to US radio, "Shake It Off" gained an audience of nine million. The song debuted at 45 on the Billboard Radio Songs chart with 29 million in all-format audience after two days of release. After its first week of release, the single debuted at number nine on the Billboard Adult Top 40 chart, and number 12 on the Billboard Mainstream Top 40, setting the record for the highest debut on both charts. On the Mainstream Top 40 chart, it tied with Mariah Carey's "Dreamlover" (1993) for the highest first-week chart entry. Although not officially released to country radio, the single debuted and peaked at number 58 on the Billboard Country Airplay chart, where it stayed for one week.

"Shake It Off" debuted at number one on the US Billboard Hot 100 chart dated September 6, 2014, the 22nd song to do so. After two consecutive weeks at number one, it dropped to number two, where it stayed for eight consecutive weeks. "Shake It Off" returned to number one in its tenth charting week, and spent a further week at number one, totaling four non-consecutive weeks atop the Hot 100. It also topped Billboard airplay-focused charts including Mainstream Top 40, Adult Top 40, and Adult Contemporary. The song sold 3.43 million digital copies in 2014 in the U.S. "Shake It Off" was one of the best-selling singles of the 2010s decade in the U.S., selling 5.4 million digital copies as of January 2020. As of July 2020, the single remains Swift's biggest chart success on the Hot 100, where it spent nearly six months in the top ten and 50 weeks in the top 100. The song was certified Diamond by the Recording Industry Association of America (RIAA), which denotes 10 million units. With this achievement, Swift is the first female artist to have both a song and an album (Fearless) certified Diamond in the U.S.

"Shake It Off" also topped the charts in Australia and Canada, where it was certified thirteen times platinum and six times platinum, respectively. In the United Kingdom, it peaked at number two on the UK Singles Chart and was the eleventh-best-selling song of 2014. It had sold one million pure copies by December 2022 and was certified quadruple platinum by the British Phonographic Industry (BPI) for sales of 2,400,000 units. In Japan, "Shake It Off" peaked at number four on the Japan Hot 100 and was certified triple platinum by the Recording Industry Association of Japan (RIAJ). The single also topped record charts in Hungary, New Zealand and Poland. It was a top-five hit in other European countries, peaking at number two in Spain; number three in Ireland, Norway and Sweden; number four in Denmark and Israel; and number five in Germany and the Netherlands.

Music video

Concept

The music video for "Shake It Off", directed by Mark Romanek, was released on August 18, 2014, the same day as the song's release. It was shot over three days in June 2014 in Los Angeles. Swift conceived the video as a humorous depiction of her trying to find her identity: "It takes a long time to figure out who you are and where you fit in in the world." To this end, the video depicts Swift as a clumsy person who unsuccessfully attempts dance moves with professional artists, including ballerinas, breakdancers, cheerleaders, and performance artists. She summed up the video: I'm putting myself in all these awkward situations where the dancers are incredible, and I'm having fun with it, but not fitting in ... I'm being embarrassingly bad at it. It shows you to keep doing you, keep being you, keep trying to figure out where you fit in in the world, and eventually you will."

The dances were choreographed by Tyce Diorio. The video's final scenes feature Swift dancing with her fans, who had been handpicked by Swift through social media engagement. The video contains references to other areas of popular culture. For instance, VH1 noted the following resemblances: the ballerinas to the 2010 film Black Swan, the breakdancers to the 2010 film Step Up 3D, the "sparkling suits and robotic dance moves" to French electronic musicians Daft Punk, the twerking dance moves to Miley Cyrus, the cheerleaders to Toni Basil's 1981 video "Mickey", and Swift's black turtleneck and jeans to the outfits of Audrey Hepburn during an audition scene in the 1957 film Funny Face. Publications including the Los Angeles Times and The Sydney Morning Herald also noted references to Lady Gaga and Skrillex.

Analysis and reception
Molly Fitzpatrick of The Guardian considered Swift "a little too skilled a dancer" for the video's concept, writing: "The incongruent blend of modern dance, ballet, and breakdancing is fun, but the conceit falls flat." Peter Vincent from The Sydney Morning Herald called the video "unoriginal", citing the many popular culture references, and doubted Swift's success in transforming her image to pop. Media professor Maryn Wilkinson noted "Shake It Off" as a representation of Swift's "zany" persona during the 1989 era. Wilkinson noted that as Swift had been associated with a hardworking and authentic persona through her country songs, her venture to "artificial, manufactured" pop required intricate maneuvering to retain her sense of authenticity. As observed by Wilkinson, in the video, after failing every dance routine, Swift laughs at herself implying that she will never "fit in" to "any commercially viable image, and prefers to embrace her natural zany state instead". In doing so, Swift reminded the audience of her authenticity underneath "the artificial manufacture of pop performances".

"Shake It Off" attracted allegations of racism and cultural appropriation for perpetuating African American stereotypes such as twerking and breakdancing. Its release coinciding with the race relation debates revolving the Ferguson unrest was also met with criticism. Analyzing the video's supposedly "racializing surveillance" in a post-racial context, communications professor Rachel Dubrofsky noted the difference between Swift's depiction of conventionally white dance moves—such as ballet and cheerleading; and conventionally black dance moves—breakdancing and twerking. She argued that while Swift's outfits and demeanor when she performs ballet or cheerleading fit her "naturally", she "does not easily embody the break-dancer's body nor does the style of dress [while twerking] fit her seamlessly". Dubrofsky summarized the video as Swift's statement of her white authenticity: "I'm so white, you know it, I know it, which makes it so funny when I try to dance like a person of color."

The Washington Post noted the video's depiction of dance moves associated with people of color, such as twerking, was another case of an ongoing debate about white pop singers embracing black culture. Romanek defended his work: "We simply choose styles of dance that we thought would be popular and amusing ... If you look at [the video] carefully, it's a massively inclusive piece. And ... it's a satirical piece. It's playing with a whole range of music video tropes and cliches and stereotypes".

Accolades
"Shake It Off" appeared on many publications' lists of the best songs of 2014. It featured in the top ten on lists by Time Out (third), PopMatters (fourth), The Village Voice Pazz & Jop critics' poll (fourth), and Consequence (eighth). The track featured on 2014 year-end lists by Drowned in Sound (14th), Dagsavisen (16th), and NME (27th). It was ranked by NME and Consequence as the 19th and 38th best song of the 2010s decade, respectively. USA Today listed "Shake It Off" as one of the ten songs that defined the 2010s.

"Shake It Off" has received many industry awards and nominations. It was honored by the 2015 Nashville Songwriters Association International, where Swift was the Songwriter of the Year. The song received an award at the 2016 BMI Pop Awards, where Swift also earned the distinction of Songwriter of the Year. At the 57th Annual Grammy Awards in 2015, "Shake It Off" was nominated in three categories: Record of the Year, Song of the Year, (both categories lost to "Stay with Me" by Sam Smith) and Best Pop Solo Performance but lost to "Happy" by Pharrell Williams.

At the 2015 Billboard Music Awards, "Shake It Off" received three nominations, winning Top Streaming Song (Video). "Shake It Off" won Song of the Year at the 2015 iHeartRadio Music Awards, Favorite International Video at the 2015 Myx Music Awards (Philippines), and Favorite Song at the 2015 People's Choice Awards. The song was nominated for the Nickelodeon Kids' Choice Awards, Teen Choice Awards, Rockbjörnen Awards (Sweden), Radio Disney Music Awards, and Los Premios 40 Principales (Spain).

Live performances

Swift premiered "Shake It Off" on television at the 2014 MTV Video Music Awards on August 24, 2014. She performed the song at the German Radio Awards on September 4. As part of promotion of 1989, she performed the song on television shows including The X Factor UK on October 12, The X Factor Australia on October 20, Jimmy Kimmel Live! on October 23, and Good Morning America on October 29. On October 27, 2014, the day of 1989 release, she performed the song as part of a mini-concert titled the "1989 Secret Sessions", live broadcast by Yahoo! and iHeartRadio. She also played "Shake It Off" on music festivals including the iHeartRadio Music Festival on September 19, the We Can Survive benefit concert at the Hollywood Bowl on October 24, and the Jingle Ball Tour 2014 on December 5. At the after party for the 40th anniversary of Saturday Night Live, Swift performed the song in an impromptu performance with host Jimmy Fallon on backing vocals and Paul McCartney on backing vocals and bass guitar.

"Shake It Off" was included on the set list on three of Swift's world tours—the 1989 World Tour, where the song was the final number, the Reputation Stadium Tour, where Swift performed the song with Camila Cabello and Charli XCX as supporting acts, and the Eras Tour (2023). On April 23, 2019, she performed an acoustic version of the song at the Time 100 Gala, where she was honored as one of the "100 most influential" people of the year.

She again performed the song on the finale of the eighth season of The Voice France on May 25, on the Wango Tango festival on June 1, at the City of Lover one-off concert in Paris on September 9, and at the We Can Survive charity concert in Los Angeles on October 19, 2019. At the 2019 American Music Awards, where she was honored as the Artist of the Decade, Swift performed "Shake It Off" as part of a medley of her hits. Halsey and Cabello joined Swift onstage during the song. She again performed the song at Capital FM's Jingle Bell Ball 2019 in London and at iHeartRadio Z100's Jingle Ball in New York City.

Controversies

2014 Triple J Hottest 100
Following a January 13, 2015 article on BuzzFeed titled "Why Isn't Everyone Voting For 'Shake It Off' In The Hottest 100?", the #Tay4Hottest100 hashtag campaign on social media emerged during the voting period for the Triple J Hottest 100, an annual poll selecting the 100 most prominent songs by Australian radio station Triple J. The campaign led to a significant amount of media coverage as Australian music fans debated the merits of Swift's inclusion in the poll. One criterion for eligibility is being played on air by Triple J at least once in 2014; Swift's "Shake It Off" did not receive airplay, but a cover of the song by the folk group Milky Chance did. According to those critical of the campaign, the Hottest 100 is reserved for non-mainstream artists who were "discovered or fostered by Triple J" and provides valuable exposure for artists in the outer circles of the music industry. Those defending the campaign criticized Triple J's practice of favoring "masculine 'rockist' " and "alternative" artists for perpetuating cultural elitism and sexism. Guardian Australias Elle Hunt wrote, "the virulent response to #Tay4Hottest100 has revealed the persistence of a dichotomy I'd thought we'd thrown out long ago: that of high art versus low."

On January 20, 2015, Guardian Australia submitted a freedom of information request to the ABC in regard to the station's response to the campaign and the eligibility of "Shake It Off" for the Hottest 100 contest. Triple J's manager Chris Scaddan told the website Tone Deaf: "We don't comment on voting campaigns while Hottest 100 voting is open. It draws attention to them and may influence the results of the poll." On January 23, The Sydney Morning Herald citing University of Queensland reported that the #Tay4Hottest100 campaign had overwhelmed the Hottest 100 for 2014—over 7,341 Hottest 100 posts over the past 30 days related to Swift, compared to 230 related to Chet Faker, the current leader of the contest. "Shake It Off" was eventually disqualified by Triple J on January 26, 2015. In the announcement, Triple J acknowledged Swift's music and career but highlighted that her entry—which had not received airtime—would not reflect their spirit. They subsequently introduced two new rules that prohibited "trolling the poll"-type campaigns for the proceeding Hottest 100 polls.

Glen Fuller, a scholar in communications, described the #Tay4Hottest100 campaign as an example of "connective action" in the age of social media. As noted by Fuller, the emergence of personalized "action frames" expressing personal viewpoints intertwining with a larger framework of information created by media publications resulted in fragmented arguments that failed to result in a definite outcome.

Lawsuits
In November 2015, Jessie Braham, an R&B singer known by the stage name Jesse Graham, claimed that Swift plagiarized his 2013 song "Haters Gonna Hate", citing his lyrics "Haters gone hate, playas gone play. Watch out for them fakers, they'll fake you everyday." He stated that Swift's "hook is the same as mine" and that there would be no "Shake It Off" if he "hadn't written 'Haters Gonna Hate' ". In the lawsuit, he alleged that 92% of Swift's "Shake It Off" came from his song, and demanded $42 million in damages from Swift and the distributor Sony. On November 12, 2015, the lawsuit was dismissed by U.S. District Court Judge Gail Standish, who ruled that Braham did not have enough factual evidence but could file a new complaint "if his lawsuit deficiencies are corrected". Standish quoted lyrics from Swift's songs "We Are Never Ever Getting Back Together", "Bad Blood", "Blank Space" and "Shake It Off":
At present, the Court is not saying that Braham can never, ever, ever get his case back in court. But, for now, we have got problems, and the Court is not sure Braham can solve them. As currently drafted, the Complaint has a blank space – one that requires Braham to do more than write his name. And, upon consideration of the Court's explanation ... Braham may discover that mere pleading BandAids will not fix the bullet holes in his case. At least for the moment, Defendants have shaken off this lawsuit.

In September 2017, songwriters Sean "Sep" Hall and Nate Butler sued Swift for copyright infringement. They alleged that the lyrics of "Shake It Off" plagiarized those of "Playas Gon' Play" (2001), a song they wrote for girl group 3LW, citing their lyrics, "Playas they gon' play, and haters they gonna hate / Ballers they gon' ball, shot callers they gonna call." U.S. District Judge Michael W. Fitzgerald, in February 2018, dismissed the case on the grounds that the lyrics in question were too "banal" to be copyrighted; but U.S. Circuit Judges John B. Owens, Andrew D. Hurwitz, and Kenneth K. Lee of the U.S. Court of Appeals for the Ninth Circuit, in October 2019, reversed the ruling, holding that the district court had "constituted itself as the final judge of the worth of an expressive work", and sent the case back to the district court.

Swift's legal team filed new documents for dismissal of the suit in July 2020, and in July 2021, filed for a summary judgment, arguing that the discovery phase of the lawsuit has turned up evidence in their favor. On December 9, 2021, Fitzgerald refused Swift's request for a summary judgement. Swift's legal team filed a second motion to dismiss the case on December 23, claiming the Fitzgerald's ruling was "unprecedented and cheats the public domain" if the plaintiffs could sue everyone who uses the phrases in any songwriting, singing or says it publicly. On January 14, 2022, Hall and Butler's legal team filed a response stating, "The rules simply do not provide defendants with vehicles for rehashing old arguments and are not intended to give an unhappy litigant one additional chance to sway the judge." On December 12, 2022, the lawsuit was dropped with no final verdict.

Cover versions and usage in media
"Shake It Off" has been covered by other musicians. English singer Labrinth performed a cover of the song at BBC Radio 1's Live Lounge September 20, 2014. English singer Charli XCX delivered a punk rock-inspired version at BBC Radio 1's Live Lounge in February 2015. Her version was nominated for Best Cover Song at the 2015 mtvU Woodie Awards. Rock singer Ryan Adams covered "Shake It Off" on his track-by-track cover of Swift's 1989, released in September 2015. The cover incorporates acoustic instruments and a thumping drum line which critics compared to that on Bruce Springsteen's 1985 song "I'm on Fire".

The song has featured in parodies and homages. In an April 2015 episode of Lip Sync Battle, actor Dwayne Johnson lip synced to "Shake It Off" and Bee Gees' 1977 song "Stayin' Alive" in a battle against Jimmy Fallon, and won. The title of "Chris Has Got a Date, Date, Date, Date, Date", a Family Guy episode featuring a fictionalized character of Swift aired on November 6, 2016, is a pun on the lyrics of "Shake It Off". Actress Reese Witherspoon and comedian Nick Kroll covered the song with EDM crossover elements for the soundtrack to the musical animated film Sing (2016). "Shake It Off" was also sung by Mexican-Kenyan actress Lupita Nyong'o on a ukulele in the 2019 film Little Monsters. A cover of the song by the cast of the 2020 television series Zoey's Extraordinary Playlist was featured in the final episode of its second season.

Personnel
Credits are adapted from the liner notes of 1989.
 Taylor Swift – vocals, background vocals, songwriter, clapping, shouts
 Cory Bice – assistant recording
 Tom Coyne – mastering
 Serban Ghenea – mixing
 John Hanes – engineering for mix
 Sam Holland – recording
 Michael Ilbert – recording
 Jonas Lindeborg – trumpet
 Max Martin – producer, songwriter, keyboard, programming, claps, shouts
 Shellback – producer, songwriter, acoustic guitar, bass guitar, keyboard, background vocals, drums, programming, claps, shouts, percussion
 Jonas Thander – saxophone
 Magnus Wiklund – trombone

Charts

Weekly charts

Year-end charts

Decade-end charts

All-time charts

Certifications

Release history

See also
 List of best-selling singles in Australia
 List of Billboard Hot 100 number ones singles of 2014
 List of Billboard Adult Contemporary number ones of 2014
 List of Billboard Adult Contemporary number ones of 2015
 List of Canadian Hot 100 number-one singles of 2014
 List of number-one digital songs of 2014 (U.S.)
 List of number-one singles of 2014 (Australia)
 List of number-one singles from the 2010s (New Zealand)
 List of most-viewed YouTube videos
 List of most-liked YouTube videos

Footnotes

References

Bibliography

2014 singles
2014 songs
Big Machine Records singles
Billboard Hot 100 number-one singles
Canadian Hot 100 number-one singles
Dance-pop songs
Music videos directed by Mark Romanek
Number-one singles in Australia
Number-one singles in Hungary
Number-one singles in New Zealand
Song recordings produced by Max Martin
Song recordings produced by Shellback (record producer)
Songs written by Max Martin
Songs written by Shellback (record producer)
Songs written by Taylor Swift
Songs involved in plagiarism controversies
Taylor Swift songs
Number-one singles in Poland
Reese Witherspoon songs
Ryan Adams songs